The Forest is a survival horror video game developed and published by Endnight Games. The game takes place on a remote heavily forested peninsula, where the player character Eric LeBlanc must fight off cannibalistic monsters while searching for his son Timmy after a plane crash. The game features nonlinear gameplay in an open world environment played from a first-person perspective, with no set missions or quests, empowering the player to make their own decisions for survival. Following a four-year long early access beta phase, the game was released for Windows in April 2018, and for the PlayStation 4 in November 2018. The game was a commercial success, selling over five million copies by the end of 2018. A sequel game, Sons of the Forest, was released in Early Access for Windows on February 23, 2023.

Gameplay 
In The Forest, players control Eric LeBlanc and must survive on a forested peninsula in search of his son Timmy after a devastating plane crash. Players must survive by creating shelter, weapons, and other survival tools. Inhabiting the peninsula, along with various woodland creatures, are a tribe of cannibalistic mutants, who dwell in villages on the surface and in deep caves beneath the peninsula. While they are not necessarily always hostile to the player, their usual behavior is aggressive, especially during the night.

However, the developers wanted players to question whether the peninsula's cannibalistic tribe is the enemy of the player or vice versa. For example, when first encountering the player, the cannibals may hesitate to attack and instead observe the player from a distance, attempt to communicate with the player through effigies, and send patrols around the player's base camp. In combat, they regularly attempt to protect one another from injury, remove torches, surround the player, hide behind cover, drag wounded tribesmen to safety, keep their distance, use tactical decisions, not overextend into unknown territory, and occasionally surrender out of fear. They are also afraid of fire, and will sometimes refrain from approaching the player if there is a campfire or torch nearby. Though there are no set missions, there is an optional conclusion to the game.

As the player progresses through the game and explores the caves underneath the forest surface, they will encounter increasingly bizarre mutations, including deformed babies and mutants with several extra appendages. The game also features a day and night cycle, with the player able to build a shelter and traps, hunt animals and collect supplies during the day, and defend themselves against the mutants by night.

The player is given a survival guide book, with notes about discovered wildlife on the peninsula, and a basic to-do list to help guide players. The guidebook also allows players to place blueprints for the various structures (such as bonfires, walls, tree-houses and traps) in the game. Simply select a blueprint, then place it in the open-world. Once placed, gather the necessary resources (like rocks and logs) in order to complete the structure. Most shelters feature an option for saving the game, since there is no autosave in the game. 

Items that the player gathers in the world (like herbs, animals furs, or tools) can be stored in the inventory. The inventory includes a crafting system, based on the player's knowledge and experimentation with creating items. To craft a basic axe, the player needs to collect then combine a stick, rock, and rope, once all items are placed on the crafting space a gear icon indicates the player can combine them. Here, the player may also choose four items for quick-select.

The HUD displays the player's total health, energy, stamina, hunger, and thirst levels. Water can be obtained from lakes and rivers, but most are contaminated causing side effects to the player. Polluted water can be boiled to purify it, or a water collector built to collect clean rainwater. Food has to be obtained from animals, plants, and other humans in the world. You can also find in your survival/crafting book stats like strength, weight, athleticism and sanity. If you lower your sanity you'll be able to build structures (effigies) that are only available when your sanity drops to a certain point.

Plot 
The game begins with Eric LeBlanc, a survival television actor, sitting in an airplane with his son, Timmy, before it suddenly crashes on a remote heavily forested peninsula. Despite being the sole survivors of the crash, a disoriented Eric watches helplessly as Timmy is kidnapped by a man covered in red paint before falling unconscious. Upon awakening in the wreckage, Eric goes out in search of his son but discovers that the peninsula is occupied by feral cannibalistic mutants, and is forced to defend himself while surviving off the land. In his search, Eric finds clues of Timmy’s whereabouts in the form of crayon drawings in several caverns. Eric may also spot the man in red from a distance, who will flee if approached.
Timmy’s drawings eventually lead Eric to an abandoned underground lab complex owned by Sahara Therapeutics, a large research company responsible for experimenting with creatures on the peninsula. Upon entering the lab, Eric finds the lab's personnel dead and discovers that they were studying an artifact called the Resurrection Obelisk. Created by a mysterious group called the Ancient Ones, the artifact has the power to resurrect the dead but requires a child sacrifice. Eric also learns that his son's kidnapper, Dr. Matthew Cross, was a chief researcher at the facility before losing his daughter Megan to an escaped mutant. Driven insane by his daughter’s death, Cross resorted to using the artifact and kidnapped Timmy as a sacrifice to revive Megan. 

Eric soon finds Cross dead and then the artifact, only to find Timmy’s corpse inside; having already been sacrificed to revive Megan. Despite being too late to save his son, Eric realizes that the machine connected to the artifact can still be used to resurrect Timmy and goes deeper into the facility in search of a sacrifice. Eric eventually encounters the revived Megan but discovers that the machine has turned her into a cannibalistic mutant and is forced to kill her when she mutates further. He then attempts to use her dead body as a sacrifice to bring back Timmy, though it ultimately ends in failure as a live sacrifice is needed. He then reaches the facility's observatory and discovers a second artifact known as the Power Obelisk, which functions as a type of EMP device capable of bringing down planes when activated, implying that Cross used it to cause the plane crash. Eric is then faced with either activating the artifact as a passenger flight passes overhead or shutting it down.

The game features two endings: 
 If Eric activates the artifact, he causes the plane to crash and is implied to have found a sacrifice to revive Timmy. One year later, Eric and Timmy have apparently been rescued and are invited onto a talk show to promote Eric's book, which chronicles his experiences on the peninsula. During the show, Timmy suddenly collapses and begins violently shaking, seemingly about to mutate like Megan did. Eric comforts Timmy and he returns to normal. Years later, an older Timmy is shown in his apartment, investigating an island labeled "Site 2" while still struggling to suppress his mutations.
 If Eric decides to shut down the artifact, he spares the lives of everyone on the plane at the cost of Timmy remaining dead. Eric then leaves the facility and burns a photo of Timmy, choosing to let go. After this final cutscene, control of Eric is then returned to the player, who can continue gameplay surviving on the peninsula.

Development 
The Forest was inspired by cult films such as The Descent and Cannibal Holocaust and video games like Don't Starve, and was accepted as part of Steam Greenlight in 2013. Canadian-based developers Endnight Games have said that Disney was an inspiration for the game, commenting that they do not want the whole game to be entirely "dark and depressing." The game is being developed to be compatible with the Oculus Rift virtual reality headset. After adding a co-op mode option during development, the team stated that they wished for the game to stay away from the massive multiplayer feel of other games, such as DayZ and Rust.

The development team has a background in film visual effects, having worked on films such as The Amazing Spider-Man 2 and Tron: Legacy. The initial budget for the game was $125,000. The game was first released for Windows via early access on 30 May 2014 before it officially released on 30 April 2018. It was later released for the PlayStation 4 on November 6, 2018. The game was built using the Unity engine.

Reception

The game received positive reception during its early access period. The game sold over 5.3 million copies on Windows by November 2018. IGN called the game a "memorable survival horror experience", praising the game for its enemy AI and multi-layered story but criticized its display settings, mentioning that the game can get too dark at times. The game's success spawned a sequel, titled Sons of the Forest which was released on February 23, 2023.

In 2020, Rock Paper Shotgun placed The Forest ninth on their "The best survival games on PC" list. On their updated list in 2023, The Forest placed 21st.

References

External links
 
Official wiki
 The Forest at MobyGames

2010s horror video games
2018 video games
Castaways in fiction
Early access video games
First-person shooters
Indie video games
Multiplayer and single-player video games
Open-world video games
PlayStation 4 games
Survival video games
Video games about cannibalism
Video games developed in Canada
Video games set in Canada
Video games set in forests
Video games set on fictional islands
Video games with alternate endings
Windows games
Works about missing people